Jim Brown: All-American is a 2002 documentary film directed by Spike Lee.

The film takes a look at the life of NFL Hall-of-Famer Jim Brown.  The film delves into his life—past, present and future—focusing on his athletic career, acting and activism.  Many people from Hollywood and sports backgrounds were interviewed for the film.  Members of Brown's family were also interviewed for the film.

Notable appearances
Art Modell
Oliver Stone
Stuart Scott
Bernie Casey
Hank Aaron
Bill Russell
James Toback
Fred Williamson
Raquel Welch
Melvin Van Peebles
Johnnie L. Cochran Jr.
Michael Wilbon
Joe Frazier
Burt Reynolds

References

External links

2002 films
2002 documentary films
American sports documentary films
Documentary films about sportspeople
Documentary films about African Americans
Documentary films about American football
Films directed by Spike Lee
Films scored by Terence Blanchard
HBO documentary films
2000s English-language films
2000s American films